Can't Say I Ain't Country is the fourth studio album by American country music duo Florida Georgia Line. It was released on February 15, 2019, through the Big Machine Label Group. It includes the singles "Simple" and "Talk You Out of It", as well as the tracks "Colorado" and "Sittin' Pretty". It was supported by a tour of the same name from May 2019.

Background and composition
Tyler Hubbard told Entertainment Tonight: "We've been working on that album for over a year now, so BK and I are definitely ready." On the sound of the album, he remarked: "A lot of the music is just kind of a throwback -- an FGL take on kind of what we grew up on, '90s country. It's a well-rounded album. We got stuff we wrote and recorded just for the live show. We got some collaborations with Jason Derulo, Jason Aldean. So, there's a little bit of everything."

Critical reception

At Metacritic, which assigns a normalized rating out of 100 to reviews from mainstream critics, the album has an average score of 58 based on 5 reviews, indicating "mixed or average reviews".

Commercial performance
Can't Say I Ain't Country debuted at number four on the US Billboard 200, giving the duo their fourth US top-five album. It entered with 50,000 album-equivalent units, including 29,000 pure album sales. The album has sold 107,000 copies in the United States as of March 2020, and 644,000 units consumed in total in the United States.

Track listing

Personnel
Adapted from AllMusic.

Florida Georgia Line
Tyler Hubbard – vocals
Brian Kelley – vocals

Additional personnel
Jason Aldean – duet vocals on "Can't Hide Red"
Dave Cohen – keyboards, piano, programming
Jason Derulo – duet vocals on "Women"
Paul Franklin – steel guitar
Jesse Frasure – programming
David Garcia – programming
Hardy – electric guitar, programming, duet vocals on "Y'all Boys"
Mark Holman – programming
Byron House – upright bass
Rob Ickes – dobro
Brother Jervel – featured vocals on "Tyler Got Him a Tesla", "All Gas No Brakes", "Sack'a Puppies", and "Catfish Nuggets"
Rob McNelley – electric guitar
Joey Moi – bass guitar, electric guitar, programming
Russ Pahl – steel guitar
Jerry Roe – drums, percussion
Justin Schipper – steel guitar
Jordan Schmidt – programming
Jimmie Lee Sloas – bass guitar
Bryan Sutton – acoustic guitar, mandolin
Ilya Toshinsky – banjo, dobro, acoustic guitar, electric guitar, mandolin
Alysa Vanderheym – programming
Derek Wells – acoustic guitar, electric guitar
Nir Z. – drums, percussion

Charts

Weekly charts

Year-end charts

Certifications

References

2019 albums
Florida Georgia Line albums
Big Machine Records albums
Albums produced by Joey Moi